El Cairo is a town and municipality located in the Department of Valle del Cauca, Colombia.

References

Municipalities of Valle del Cauca Department